Zikris are an Islamic Mahdist sect found mostly in the Balochistan region of western Pakistan. The name Zikri comes from the Arabic word dhikr.

Origins 

The Zikri faith developed in Makran in the late 16th century.

Zikris believe in a mysterious Mahdist figure known as Nur Pak, or "pure light". Zikris believe Nur Pak walked the earth before Adam and will return at the end of days to restore true Islam.

Zikris have been mistakenly identified as being part of the Indian Mahdavia sect. Outside observers have claimed the Mahdi figure of the Balochi Zikris was Muhammad Juanpuri. However, the Balochi Zikris dispute this, denying that Muhammad Jaunpuri visited Balochistan and insisting their Mahdi is a different figure from a later period. Zikris believe Nur Pak was born in 977 AH, or between 1569 and 1570 AD.

According to Sabir Badalkhan, the vast majority of Zikris, including their most influential leaders, reject the notion their Mahdi was Muhammad Jaunpuri, pointing to the different birth dates and deaths of Juanpuri and their Mahdi. They state their ancestors have never head of Juanpuri, and that there are not relations between Zikri and Mahdavi communities, and that their beliefs and practices are distinct.

Practices 
Zikris make a pilgrimage (ziyarat) to Koh-e-Murad, "Mountain of Desire" in Balochi, on the 27th of Ramadan in commemoration of their Mahdi. They observe this day as a sacred holiday. The descendants of the original believers of the Mahdi continue to lead the Zikri community and are known as murshids. Zikris refer to them as waja as a form of respect. Early that morning, Zikris observe Shab-e-Qadr, the commemoration of Muhammad receiving his first revelation from the Angel Gabriel.

Zikris observe daily prayers called zikr. There are five daily zikrs. Three prayers are obligatory and performed in group orally. Two are silent and generally performed only by older and more devout Zikris. Women perform only the spoken zikrs. The five prayer are known as Gwarbamay, Nemrochay, Rochzarday, Sarshapay, and Nemhangamay. Rochzarday and Nemhangamay may be performed individually, with all others being said in a group.

Zikri places of worship are called Zikr-khanas. Zikris gather at three times a day Zikr-khanas and perform a special prayer in a square formation with the leader in the middle. This prayer consists of formulae in Persian and Balochi, Quranic verses, and the repetition of God's name while standing, sitting, and prostrating. Zikri worshippers wear white or light-colored clothing, wash before participating, and cover their head with a scarf or handkerchief called a rumal.  Non-Zikris are forbidden to attend Zikri worship services at the Zikr-khana. Zikr-khanas were often built on astanas, places deemed holy by the Zikri community. This could be a place a murshid meditated or the former home of a community leader.

On special occasions, Zikris observe chaugan, songs of praise for Muhammad, the Mahdi, Turbat and Koh-i-Murad, accompanied by ritual dance-like movements. Members stay up all night performing devotions. A female reciter known as the shehr stands in the middle of the formation reciting devotions to which the male group calls back.

Chaugans are sung in celebration of religious events such as the 27th of Ramadan, Shab-i-barat (the 15th day of Sha'ban), and Eid al-Adha. Zikris believe the fourteenth day of the lunar month, if it falls on a Friday, to be auspicious, and may perform the chaugan then.

Persecution 
Zikris have faced persecution from other Muslims for their beliefs. After the establishment of Pakistan, Sunni Muslims attacked Zikris and subjected them to forced conversions. With the general rise of Islamic extremism and jihadism in the region since the 1980s, Zikris have been discriminated against, targeted, and killed by Sunni militants in Pakistan. Under the military government of Zia-al-Haqq, Sunnis sought to have Zikris declared as non-Muslims. In the 1990s, Zikris were harassed, and protestors called for the destruction of their shrines.

The persecution of Zikris by Sunni militants as of 2014 has been part of the larger backlash against religious minorities in Pakistani Balochistan, targeting Hindus, Hazaras, Shias, and Zikris, resulting in the migration of over 300,000 Shias, Zikris, and Hindus from Pakistani Balochistan. The militant groups Lashkar-i-Jhangvi and the Pakistani Taliban were responsible.

Population 
The United States Senate Committee on Foreign Relations in 2004 stated that there were "approximately 200,000" Zikris. Gall stated that they were "estimated to number over 750,000 people". Victoria Williams estimated 800,000 Zikris.

Zikris live primarily in Pakistani Balochistan, concentrated in the southern coast of Makran, the Lasbela District, and Quetta. They are a majority in the Gwadar District of Makran in Balochistan. There are sizable communities of Zikris in Pakistan's Sindh province and Karachi, especially in the economically disadvantaged Lyari Town.

Further reading 

 Azhar Munīr, I. A. Rehman. 'Zikris in the light of history & their religious beliefs', Izharsons, 1998.

References 

Islamic branches

Balochistan
Mahdism